Kabaddi was contested by five teams at the 1994 Asian Games in Hiroshima, Japan from October 12 to October 14.

India won the gold by a 4-0 record, For India the crunch match was against Pakistan, their first match against Pakistan was abandoned in controversial circumstances when the scores were tied 19-all with more than a minute left for the final whistle. A replay was ordered by the technical committee.

Schedule

Medalists

Results
All times are Japan Standard Time (UTC+09:00)

Final standing

References
 New Straits Times, October 12–15, 1994

External links
 Results

 
1994 Asian Games events
1994
Asian Games
1994 Asian Games